Dick van Burik (born 29 November 1973) is a retired Dutch professional footballer who played as a central defender. Van Burik has three daughters, Dominique, Michele and Estelle van Burik.

Club career
Born in Utrecht, Van Burik played in the Eredivisie with Ajax, NAC and FC Utrecht.

However, he would be best known for a 10-year stint with German Bundesliga outfit Hertha BSC, where he would be a defensive mainstay for a side that participated in five UEFA Cup editions and the 1999–2000 UEFA Champions League (as a result of a third league place in 1998–99, with Van Burik subsequently appearing in ten Champions League contests, as Hertha reached the second group stage).

Van Burik was dismissed by Hertha after the club accused him of playing a role in the departure of teammate Jérôme Boateng, who was a client of van Burik's father and football agent Karel. He subsequently retired in June 2007, at 33 years of age.

Retirement
He was assistant manager at SC Heerenveen from February to June 2010. He runs a football agency, EuroSoccerAdvice, with his father and owns a protective coating company, VB Coatings/Line-X Nederland.

References

External links
 
 

1973 births
Living people
Footballers from Utrecht (city)
Association football central defenders
Dutch footballers
Dutch expatriate footballers
Expatriate footballers in Germany
Dutch expatriate sportspeople in Germany
AFC Ajax players
NAC Breda players
FC Utrecht players
Hertha BSC players
Bundesliga players
Eredivisie players
Dutch sports agents
Association football agents
Dutch businesspeople
SC Heerenveen non-playing staff